The Polish Sports Personality of the Year (Polish: Plebiscyt Przeglądu Sportowego na najlepszego polskiego sportowca roku) is chosen annually since 1926 by the readers of the newspaper Przegląd Sportowy, which makes it the second oldest such contest in the world. The winner is the sportsperson, judged by a public vote, to have achieved the most in the previous year.

The first winner of the award was track and field athlete Wacław Kuchar. Between 1939 and 1947, the contest was not held due to the Second World War. Record holders are footballer Robert Lewandowski and swimmer Otylia Jędrzejczak with three titles each; track and field athletes Irena Szewińska and Stanisława Walasiewicz, as well as ski jumper Adam Małysz with four titles each; while cross country skier Justyna Kowalczyk is the current leader who holds five titles. Fencer Jerzy Pawłowski holds the record number of eleven appearances among the top 10 athletes. As of 2022, the award has been given 59 times to male and 28 times to female athletes.

Apart from the main award, winners are announced in additional categories such as Super Champion Lifetime Achievement Award, Coach of the Year, Team of the Year, Sport Without Barriers Award for disabled athletes and Sporting Event of the Year.

Polish Sports Personality of the Year

Most successful sportspeople

Winners by sport

See also
Polish Footballer of the Year
Sport in Poland

References

Sport in Poland
National sportsperson-of-the-year trophies and awards
Polish awards
Awards established in 1926
1926 establishments in Poland